Ayancık is a town and district of Sinop Province in the Black Sea region of Turkey. The mayor is Hayrettin Kaya (CHP).

History
In the late 19th and early 20th century, Ayancık was part of the Kastamonu Vilayet of the Ottoman Empire. Being the most ideal hilltop in Sinop, Ayancik was the site of a US military radar station from 1951 to 1992 during the Cold War. The radar was finally shut down in 1999 due to its technological obsolescence.

References

External links
 District governor's official website 
 The City of Guide is Ayancık 

Populated places in Sinop Province
Populated coastal places in Turkey
Districts of Sinop Province
Towns in Turkey
Ayancık district